Schopp is a surname. Notable people with the surname include:

 Herman Schopp (1899–1954), Austrian cinematographer
 Markus Schopp (born 1974), Austrian footballer

See also
Schöpp